The Japan–Korea Treaty of 1905, also known as the Eulsa Treaty, Eulsa Unwilling Treaty or Japan–Korea Protectorate Treaty, was made between the Empire of Japan and the Korean Empire in 1905. Negotiations were concluded on November 17, 1905. The treaty deprived Korea of its diplomatic sovereignty and made Korea a protectorate of Imperial Japan. It resulted from Imperial Japan's victory in the Russo-Japanese War in 1905.

Names
In the metonymy Eulsa Treaty, the word Eulsa or Ulsa derives the Sexagenary Cycle's 42nd year of the Korean calendar, in which the treaty was signed. The treaty is identified by several names including Second Japan–Korea Convention  (Japanese: 第二次日韓協約, Korean: 제2차 한일협약, 第二次韓日協約), Eulsa Restriction Treaty (Korean: 을사늑약, 乙巳勒約), Eulsa Protection Treaty (Japanese: 乙巳保護条約, Korean: 을사보호조약), and Korea Protection Treaty (Japanese: 韓国保護条約).

Background
Following Imperial Japan's victory in the Russo-Japanese War, with its subsequent withdrawal of Russian influence, and the Taft–Katsura Agreement, in which the United States allegedly agreed not to interfere with Japan in matters concerning Korea, the Japanese government sought to formalize its sphere of influence over the Korean Peninsula.

Delegates of both Empires met in Seoul to resolve differences in matters pertaining to Korea's future foreign policy; however, with the Korean Imperial palace under occupation by Japanese troops, and the Imperial Japanese Army stationed at strategic locations throughout Korea, the Korean side was at a distinct disadvantage in the discussions.

Formation of treaty

On 9 November 1905, Itō Hirobumi arrived in Hanseong and gave a letter from the Emperor of Japan to Gojong, Emperor of Korea, asking him to sign the treaty. On 15 November 1905, he ordered Japanese troops to encircle the Korean imperial palace and threatened the emperor in order to force him to agree to the treaty.

On 17 November 1905, Ito and Japanese Field Marshal Hasegawa Yoshimichi entered the Jungmyeongjeon Hall, a Russian-designed building that was once part of Deoksu Palace, to persuade Gojong to agree, but he refused. Ito pressured the cabinet with the implied, and later stated, threat of bodily harm, to sign the treaty. According to 한계옥 (Han-Gyeok), Korean prime minister Han Gyu-seol disagreed, shouting loudly. Ito ordered the guards to lock him in a room and said if he continued screaming, they could kill him. The Korean cabinet signed an agreement that had been prepared by Ito in the Jungmyeongjeon. The Agreement gave Imperial Japan complete responsibility for Korea's foreign affairs, and placed all trade through Korean ports under Imperial Japanese supervision.

Treaty provisions
This treaty deprived Korea of its diplomatic sovereignty, in effect making Korea a protectorate of Imperial Japan. As a consequence, the Korean Empire had to close its diplomatic representations abroad, including its short-lived legation in Beijing, and its legation in Washington, D.C.

The provisions of the treaty took effect on November 17, 1905, and it laid the foundation for the Japan–Korea Treaty of 1907, and subsequent annexation of Korea in 1910.

The treaty was deemed to have gone into effect after it received the signature of five Korean ministers:
Minister of Education Lee Wan-yong
Minister of Army Yi Geun-taek
Minister of Interior Yi Ji-yong
Minister of Foreign Affairs Park Je-sun
Minister of Agriculture, Commerce and Industry Gwon Jung-hyeon

Emperor Gojong of Korea did not assent or sign the treaty. Other officials who disputed the treaty included:
 Prime Minister Han Kyu-seol
 Minister of Finance Min Yeong-gi
 Minister of Justice Yi Ha-yeong (

Controversy

Emperor Gojong sent personal letters to major heads of state to appeal for their support against the illegal signing. As of February 21, 1908, he had sent 17 letters bearing his imperial seal, to the following eight heads of state:
 King Edward VII of the United Kingdom
 President Armand Fallières of France
 Emperor Nicholas II of Russia
 Emperor Franz Joseph of Austria-Hungary
 King Victor Emmanuel III of Italy
 King Leopold II of Belgium
 Emperor Kuang-hsu of China
 Emperor Wilhelm II of Germany, which was personally handwritten by Gojong

In 1907, Emperor Gojong sent three secret emissaries to the second international Hague Peace Convention to protest the unfairness of the Eulsa Treaty. But the great powers of the world refused to allow Korea to take part in the conference.

Not only the Emperor but other Koreans protested against the Treaty. Jo Byeong-se and Min Yeong-hwan, who were high officials and led resistance against Eulsa treaty, killed themselves as resistance. Local yangbans and commoners joined righteous armies. They were called "Eulsa Euibyeong" (을사의병, 乙巳義兵) meaning "Righteous army against Eulsa Treaty".

After completing the treaty, Emperor Gojong tried to let the world know the unfairness of the treaty, including sending a special envoy to The Hague. This directly contributed to the forced retirement of King Gojong.

Rescission

Gojong's declaration of rescission 
Thereafter, Gojong tried to inform the international community of the injustice of the 2nd Korea-Japan Agreement, but according to the logic of the international situation at the time, Gojong's secrets were not effective. Gojong's declaration of Rescission in the Eulsa Treaty had the following, but it was not recognized internationally:

 A national document written on January 29, 1906,
 Personal letter handed to Special Commissioner Hulbert on June 22, 1906,
 A letter sent to the President of France on June 22, 1906,
 Gojong's power of attorney given to the Hague Special Envoy Lee Sang-seol on April 20, 1907, etc.

This treaty, later, was confirmed to be "already null and void" by the Treaty on Basic Relations between Japan and the Republic of Korea concluded in 1965.

In a joint statement on June 23, 2005, officials of South Korea and North Korea reiterated their stance that the Eulsa treaty is null and void on a claim of coercion by the Japanese.

As of 2010, South Korea was seizing property and other assets from the descendants of people who have been identified as pro-Japanese collaborators (Chinilpa) at the time of the treaty.

Aftermath 
After the treaty, Japanese influence on Korea dramatically increased. All of the diplomatic mission of Korea was disestablished. All of the foreign relation of Korea was administered by a Japanese Resident-General. Itō Hirobumi was appointed as the first Resident-General.

See also

 Japan–Korea Treaty of 1904
 Japan–Korea Agreement of August 1904
 Japan–Korea Agreement of April 1905
 Japan–Korea Agreement of August 1905
 Japan–Korea Treaty of 1907
 Japan–Korea Treaty of 1910
 Anglo-Japanese Alliance
 Taft–Katsura Agreement
 Treaty of Portsmouth
 Root–Takahira Agreement
 Unequal treaty
 Liancourt Rocks
 Governor-General of Korea

References

Bibliography
  ; ;  OCLC 14719443
 Carnegie Endowment for International Peace, Division of International Law. (1921). Pamphlet 43: Korea, Treaties and Agreements." The Endowment: Washington, D.C. OCLC 1644278
 Clare, Israel Smith; Hubert Howe Bancroft and George Edwin Rines. (1910). Library of universal history and popular science. New York: The Bancroft society. OCLC 20843036
 Cordier, Henri and Edouard Chavannes. (1905).  "Traité entre le Japon et la Corée," Revue internationale de Sinologie (International Journal of Chinese studies). Leiden: E. J. Brill. OCLC 1767648
  ; ; ;  OCLC 232346524
 Korean Mission to the Conference on the Limitation of Armament, Washington, D.C., 1921–1922. (1922). Korea's Appeal to the Conference on Limitation of Armament. Washington: U.S. Government Printing Office. OCLC 12923609
 Pak, Chʻi-yŏng. (2000). Korea and the United Nations. The Hague: Kluwer Law International. ; OCLC 247402192
 Tae-Jin, Yi. "Treaties Leading to Japan’s Annexation of Korea: What Are the Problems?." Korea Journal'' 56.4 (2016): 5-32.  online

Japan–Korea relations
History of the foreign relations of Japan
Japanese imperialism and colonialism
Unequal treaties
1905 in Japan
1905 in Korea
Treaties concluded in 1905
Treaties of the Empire of Japan
Treaties of the Korean Empire
November 1905 events
Bilateral treaties of Japan